The 1990 Kentucky Wildcats football team represented the University of Kentucky in the Southeastern Conference (SEC) during the 1990 NCAA Division I-A football season.  In their first season under head coach Bill Curry, the Wildcats compiled a 4–7 record (3–4 against SEC opponents), finished in sixth place in the SEC, and were outscored by their opponents, 316 to 228.  The team played its home games in Commonwealth Stadium in Lexington, Kentucky.

The team's statistical leaders included Freddie Maggard with 1,055 passing yards, Al Baker with 780 rushing yards, and Phil Logan with 565 receiving yards.

Bill Curry had been the head football coach at Alabama from 1987 to 1989, compiling a 26–10 record with the Crimson Tide. He was the SEC Coach of the Year in 1989. He was hired by Kentucky in January 1990.

Schedule

References

Kentucky
Kentucky Wildcats football seasons
Kentucky Wildcats football